Valencia Club de Futbol Juvenil are the under-19 team of Spanish professional football club Valencia. 
They play in the Group VII of the División de Honor Juvenil de Fútbol where their main rivals are Villarreal and Levante. 

They also participate in the national Copa de Campeones Juvenil and the Copa del Rey Juvenil, qualification for which is dependent on final league group position, and have taken part in the continental UEFA Youth League.

Juvenil A

Current squad

Season to season (Juvenil A)

Superliga / Liga de Honor sub-19
Seasons with two or more trophies shown in bold

División de Honor Juvenil de Fútbol
Seasons with two or more trophies shown in bold

Honours 
National competitions

 División de Honor: 6
1995–96, 1997–98, 2006–07, 2009–10, 2011–12, 2013–14
 Copa de Campeones: 1
2006–07
 Copa del Rey: 1
1961

See also
Valencia CF
Valencia CF Mestalla

References

Juvenil A
Football academies in Spain
División de Honor Juvenil de Fútbol
UEFA Youth League teams